This is a list of Delaware State Hornets football players in the NFL Draft.

Key

Selections

References

Delaware State

Delaware State Hornets NFL Draft